The Women's World Chess Championship 2012 was a knockout tournament, to decide the women's world champion. The title was won by Anna Ushenina of Ukraine for the first time. Defending champion Hou Yifan went out in the second round.

The tournament was played as a 64-player knockout type in Khanty Mansiysk, Russia, from 10 November to 1 December 2012. Each pairing consisted of two games, and tie-breaks at faster time controls, if necessary.

After only two wins by lower rated players in the first round, the second round saw the top three seeds all going out to players rated 150 Elo points below them, of those third seed Anna Muzychuk lost to the eventual world champion. The fourth seed went out in the quarter-final. The final consisted of four games at classical time control, followed by tie-break games; in it Anna Ushenina beat former women's world champion Antoaneta Stefanova in the first set of tie-breaks. The unexpected final of two lower seeded players raised questions, if a single match knock-out system is the best way to determine the world champion.

Ushenina lost her title in the Women's World Chess Championship 2013, after game seven of a ten-game match against Hou Yifan, winner of the FIDE Women's Grand Prix 2011–2012.

Participants
Players qualified to the tournament through the previous world championship, the FIDE rating list, continental championships and two FIDE president nominees. Players were seeded by their Elo ratings (November 2012 list), except that defending champion Hou Yifan was the no. 1 seed.

 , 2606, GM (WC)
 , 2610, GM (WC)
 , 2586, GM (J10)
 , 2565, GM (WC)
 , 2553, GM (E11)
 , 2539, GM (E10)
 , 2524, GM (E10)
 , 2521, GM (E10)
 , 2517, IM (R)
 , 2516, GM (E10)
 , 2515, GM (E10)
 , 2512, GM (AS11)
 , 2504, IM (E11)
 , 2501, GM (R)
 , 2501, WGM (Z3.5)
 , 2491, GM (E10)
 , 2491, GM (R)
 , 2489, IM (Z2.1)
 , 2478, WGM (E11)
 , 2476, IM (E10)
 , 2476, GM (E11)
 , 2470, GM (E11)
 , 2470, IM (Z2.1)
 , 2468, IM (R)
 , 2467, WGM (PN)
 , 2465, WGM (Z3.5)
 , 2457, IM (E11)
 , 2455, IM (E11)
 , 2454, IM (E10)
 , 2452, IM (R)
 , 2451, GM (E10)
 , 2445, GM (E10)
 , 2441, IM (R)
 , 2432, WGM (PN)
 , 2429, WGM (J11)
 , 2428, IM (E10)
 , 2415, IM (E11)
 , 2414, GM (E11)
 , 2413, WGM (Z3.5)
 , 2410, IM (E10)
 , 2409, IM (E10)
 , 2394, IM (Z3.3)
 , 2384, IM (E11)
 , 2383, IM (E11)
 , 2383, IM (E11)
 , 2377, IM (E11)
 , 2369, IM (Z2.5)
 , 2367, WGM (E10)
 , 2355, IM (E11)
 , 2321, WGM (AS10)
 , 2304, WGM (Z2.1)
 , 2273, WGM (AM)
 , 2251, WGM (Z3.7)
 , 2220, WIM (Z3.4)
 , 2219, WIM (Z3.1)
 , 2209, WGM (Z3.5)
 , 2190, IM (Z3.6)
 , 2175, WFM (Z2.4)
 , 2159, WIM (Z2.3)
 , 2155, WGM (AF)
 , 2138, WIM (Z2.2)
 , 2055, WIM (AF)
 , 1871, WIM (AF)
 , 1821, WIM (Z3.2)

Qualification paths 

WC: Women's World Champion, runner-up of Women's World Chess Championship 2011, semifinalist of Women's World Chess Championship 2010 
J10 and J11: World Junior Champions 2010 and 2011
R: Rating (average of all published ratings from July 2011 to January 2012 was used) (6)
E10 and E11: European Individual Championships 2010 and 2011 (28)
AM: American Continental Chess Championship 2011
AS10 and AS11: Asian Chess Championships 2010 and 2011
AF: African Chess Championship 2011 (3)
Z2.1 (3), Z2.2, Z2.3, Z2.4, Z2.5, Z3.1, Z3.2, Z3.3, Z3.4, Z3.5 (4), Z3.6, Z3.7: Zonal tournaments
PN: FIDE President nominee (2)

Notable non-participants

The number one woman in the world, Judit Polgár, has never competed for the women's title and did not enter this time either. Other notable absentees were: women's number six Nana Dzagnidze, 2010 finalist Ruan Lufei, and ex-champion Maia Chiburdanidze (inactive).

Format
Each pairing consisted of two games played over two days, one with white and one with black. The time controls in the classical games were 90 minutes for the first 40 moves with a 30-minute addition on move 41. In case of a tie, tiebreaks were played the next day. The format for the tie breaks was as follows:
 Two rapid games (25 minutes plus 10 second increment) were played.
 If the score was still tied, two rapid games (10 minutes plus 10 second increment) were played.
 If the match is tied after these two games, the opponents played two blitz games (5 minutes plus 3-second increment).
 If the score was still tied after pair of blitz games, a single Armageddon game (white must win, black only needs to draw) would be played. White had 5 minutes, black had 4 minutes, and both players had three-second increments beginning with move 61.

Prize pool
The championship had a prize-pool of 450,000 US-Dollar. Prizes were $3,750 for first round losers, $5,500 for the second round, 8,000 for the third. Losing quarter-finalists picked up $12,000, the semi-finalists $20,000. Stefanova then got $30,000 for finishing runner-up to Ushenina, who got $60,000 prize money. It was the same distribution as in the 2010 knock-out championship.

Coverage

The tournament was streamed on the tournament website each day in full length. Live coverage was interrupted only for advertising breaks. The videostream was also playable on demand until the next day started. Coverage was provided in low and high definition with Grand Master commentary in three languages: English, Russian and for the first time Chinese. In the final days the broadcast was watched by several hundred thousand live viewers.

Results

Final match

The final match was decided after four matches at classical time controls and two rapid tie-breaks. Anna Ushenina won the title, beating 2004 Women's World Chess champion Stefanova. Stefanova also was the reigning Women's World Rapid champion.

{| class="wikitable" style="text-align:center"
|+Women's World Chess Championship Final 2012
|-
! !! Rating !! width=1em|1 !! width=1em|2 !! width=1em|3 !! width=1em|4 !! R1 !! R2 !! Total
|-
| align=left |  || 2491
| style="background:black; color:white"| ½ || ½ ||style="background:black; color:white"| 0 || 1 || ½ ||style="background:black; color:white"| 0 || 2½
|-
| align=left |  || 2452
| ½ ||style="background:black; color:white"| ½ || 1 ||style="background:black; color:white"| 0 ||style="background:black; color:white"| ½ || 1 || 3½
|}

Bracket
First round pairings were published on 1 November 2012.

References

External links
Chessdom: Women's World Chess Championship 2012 participants and qualification criteria
FIDE report 

Women's World Chess Championships
2012 in chess
2012 in Russian sport
Chess in Russia
International sports competitions hosted by Russia
Sport in Khanty-Mansiysk